Kreillerstraße is a Munich U-Bahn station on line U2.

Overview 

The station was opened on 29 May 1999 and is situated in Berg am Laim. It is situated beneath the street with the same name, that leads to Wasserburg. The red walls are covered by perforated aluminium panels and bricks. The ceiling is also covered by bended aluminium panels. They reflect the light of the 3 light sources of which only 1 is visible.
The floor is covered by granite slabs. At the western end of the station stairs and an elevator lead to a mezzanine and from there to the ground level with the junction Kreillerstraße/St.-Veit-Straße where the Tram 19 to Pasing leaves. At the eastern end you also reach a mezzanine using stairs and from there the Kreillerstraße.

Stations

References

External links 
 More information

Munich U-Bahn stations
Railway stations in Germany opened in 1999